Barysaw or Borisov is a city in Minsk Region, Belarus, located on the Berezina River and  north-east from Minsk. Its population is around 145,000.

History

Early history
Barysaw is first mentioned in the Laurentian Codex as being founded (as Borisov) in 1102 by the Prince of Polotsk Rogvolod Vseslavich, who had the baptismal name of Boris. During the next two centuries, it was burned and then rebuilt south of where it was before.

Under Lithuania
From the late 13th century to 1795, the town was part of the Grand Duchy of Lithuania, which was itself involved in many unions – the Union of Krewo (1385)  and Union of Lublin (1569).

In 1500, during the Lithuanian–Muscovite War, Alexander Jagiellon resided in Barysaw Castle. In 1563, it was granted Magdeburg town rights by King Sigismund II Augustus.

1790s 
In the last years of the Polish-Lithuanian Commonwealth, troops were stationed here, including the 4th Lithuanian Vanguard Regiment, and King Stanisław August Poniatowski established the town's coat of arms (decree #17435), the top half containing the coat of arms of Minsk, while the lower half had two stylized towers on a silver background with a passage between them and Saint Peter above the towers holding a key in his hand.

Barysaw became part of the Russian Empire in 1793 as a result of the Second Partition of Poland.

19th century
After the Partitions of Poland, Barysaw was an uyezd town in the Minsk Governorate.

Napoleonic Wars 
In 1812, Barysaw became a crucial location when Napoleon's troops crossed the Berezina river. The French feinted a crossing at the town itself, but successfully escaped the pursuing armies by building two wooden bridges north of the city, at Studianka. This event is reenacted by military locals during town festivals. A cannon from the Napoleonic era is kept by the town's museum.

In 1871, the railway between Brest and Moscow passed near Barysaw, and a station was built there. In 1900 the area around the station was annexed the town.

20th century

World War I and Polish-Soviet War 
During World War I, after the fall of Tsarist Russia, fights broke out for control of the city and it changed owners several times. In November 1917 the area became a part of Soviet Russia, from early 1918 it was occupied by Germany, in December 1918 it fell to the Soviets again, from 1919 to 1920 it was controlled by Poland, before being captured by the Soviets for the third time.

Interbellum 
Soviet rule was recognized by the Peace of Riga in 1921 and the city was included in the Belarusian Soviet Socialist Republic.

World War II 
During World War II, Barysaw was occupied by Nazi Germany from 2 July 1941 to 1 July 1944, and most of the city was destroyed. More than 33,000 people were killed in six death camps which were constructed around the town.

Recent period 
Since May 1948 the city has been home to the headquarters of the 7th Tank Army, which became the 65th Army Corps and then the North Western Operational Command of the Armed Forces of Belarus in 2001. In 2000s the Head of City Administration, or Mayor, was Vassily Burgun.

Industry
After World War II, Barysaw became a major industrial centre; as of 2002 there are 41 large factories exporting their goods to Russia, the CIS, and worldwide. The railroad is still an important artery, but now it is powered by overhead electric lines.

The following industries are prominent in town: Borisov Plant of Motor-and-Tractor Electric Machinery, Borisov Plant Avtogydrousilitel,  Borisov Aggregate Works, Ekran Company, Dzerzhynski Crystal Works, Borisov Plastics Plant, the 140th Repair Works, the 2566th Plant on Radioelectronics Equipment Maintenance, the Rezinotekhnika Company, Borisov Meat Packing Plant, Borisov Plant of Polymer Package Polimiz, the Belarusian-German joint venture Frebor, the Lesokhimik Company, the Metallist Company, the Paper Factory of the state emblem department under the Finance Ministry of the Republic of Belarus, the Borisovdrev Company, the Borisovkhlebprom Company, Borisov Bakery, Borisov Sewing Factory, the Shveinik Company, Kischenko Crafts Factory, Borisov Dairy, Borisov Tinned Plant, others. The total industrial staff reaches 31,019 people.

The largest factories, in no particular order, are:
 BATE (electricity automobile parts)
 AGU (avto-gidro-usilitel — power steering in Russian)
 Pharmaceutical plant (medpreparatov)
 Turbocompressors plant (agregatov)
 Match factory (Borisovdrev)
BoriMak (factory producing pasta, spaghetti)
Zdravushka (Dairy products)
Rezinotechnika (Rubber factory)
Meat processing factory
DOC (Wood products manufactury)

Modern living

The town is divided by the river into old and new parts connected by two bridges. The railway station, international road, Ispolkom (ex-KPSS Gorispolkom), military staff headquarters and the central square are in the new part. As usual for this region, families live mostly in flats in large, modern apartment buildings, but there are some single-family homes on the outskirts, some of which do not yet have indoor plumbing. The water comes from an artesian well and is very clean and healthy.

Authorities
 President of the Republic of Belarus Aleksandr Lukashenko on 9 January 2009 assigned Vladimir Miranovich to the position of Head of Regional Administration (Ispolkom).

Sport

Main sport sites: 2 stadiums, 3 swimming pools, 14 shooting galleries, and 8 sports-grounds.

The city has its own football team, BATE Borisov. The team won the Belarusian Premier League 15 times, and competed in the UEFA Cup and UEFA Champions League. There is also a famous basketball team Berezina-RCOR. European basketball championship for women (division B) was organized in Barysaw.

Media
 Borisovskiye Novosti newspaper: privately owned independent media on both languages.  A recent scandal related to an attempt by the Mayor to stop distribution of the paper, recently overturned by a court
 Official “Adzinstva” newspaper in Belarusian.
 Local TV company "Skif"

Notable residents

 Iosif Adamovich (1897 – 1937), Belarusian politician
 Anatoly Gromyko (1932–2017), Soviet and Russian scientist and diplomat.
 Anatoly Chubais (born 1955), Soviet and Russian economist
 Haim Laskov (1919-1982), the fifth Chief of Staff of the Israel Defense Forces
 Andrei Aramnau (born 1988), weightlifter and world record holder
 Dzmitry Baha (born 1990), footballer

International relations

Barysaw is twinned with:
 Kapan, Armenia
 Narva, Estonia        
 Podolsk, Russia
 Pazardzhik, Bulgaria
 Maloyaroslavets, Russia

References

External links

Website of the City of Barysaw
Barysaw Online
Photos of Borisov Uyezd by Prokudin-Gorsky (early 20th century) 
 Rayispolkom (Official website of Regional Executive Committee)
 

 
1102 establishments in Europe
Cities in Belarus
Populated places in Minsk Region
Barysaw District
Borisovsky Uyezd
Minsk Voivodeship